Guadalupe is one of the 67 municipalities of Chihuahua, in northern Mexico. The capital lies at Guadalupe. The municipality covers an area of 6,200.5 km².

As of 2010, the municipality had a total population of 6,458,

Other than the town of Guadalupe, the municipality had 195 localities, none of which had a population over 1,000.

Geography

Towns and villages
The municipality has 80 localities. The largest are:

Adjacent municipalities and counties
 Ojinaga Municipality - south
 Coyame del Sotol Municipality - south
 Ahumada Municipality - south
 Juárez Municipality - west
 El Paso County, Texas - northwest
 Práxedis G. Guerrero Municipality - north
 Hudspeth County, Texas - north and northeast
 Jeff Davis County, Texas - east-southeast  
 Presidio County, Texas - east- southeast

Crime
A narcofosa (mass grave attributed to organized crime) containing the remains of 13 people was discovered in Bravos in June 2018.

References

Municipalities of Chihuahua (state)
Chihuahua (state) populated places on the Rio Grande